Livraria Cultura is a chain of bookstores in Brazil, founded in 1948 in São Paulo by Eva Herz.

History 
In 1947, Eva Herz, daughter of German immigrants, set up a book rental service called Biblioteca Circulante (Circulating Library) at her home in Alameda Lorena, São Paulo. The books were imported from Europe and their clientele was mainly immigrants. The service became popular and the circulating library started to borrow books from Brazilian authors, as well as to sell them.

In 1969, Herz moved the bookstore, now called Livraria Cultura,  to the Conjunto Nacional on Avenida Paulista. Eva's son, Pedro Herz, became her partner in the company.

The company expanded to a chain present in several cities in Brazil, such as Brasília, Campinas, Curitiba, Fortaleza, Porto Alegre, Recife, Ribeirão Preto, and Salvador, as well as having a store specialized in comics, videogames and other pop culture goods, called Geek.Etc.Br  in São Paulo. On July 19, 2017, Livraria Cultura acquired the operation of Fnac in Brazil without disclosing figures. At the end of the same year the bookstore purchased the online marketplace Estante Virtual.

After years of financial losses, which included the closing of the physical units in Rio de Janeiro, the company filed a request for judicial recovery on October 24, 2018, seeking to renegotiate its debts with book publishers and other creditors of the company.

In February, 9th 2023, the Livraria Cultura had its bankruptcy decreed by the 2nd Bankruptcy and Judicial Recovery Court of São Paulo.

References

External links 
 Livraria Cultura website

Bookshops of Brazil
Culture in São Paulo
Companies based in São Paulo